Slatnik is a village in the Municipality of Ribnica in southern Slovenia. It lies just south of the town of Ribnica. The area is part of the traditional region of Lower Carniola and is now included in the Southeast Slovenia Statistical Region.

A small chapel-shrine in the settlement is dedicated to the Virgin Mary and dates to the early 20th century.

References

External links
Slatnik on Geopedia

Populated places in the Municipality of Ribnica